The following is a list of notable deaths in September 2005.

Entries for each day are listed alphabetically by surname. A typical entry lists information in the following sequence:
 Name, age, country of citizenship at birth, subsequent country of citizenship (if applicable), reason for notability, cause of death (if known), and reference.

September 2005

1
Terry Albritton, 50, American shotputter.
Manuel Ausensi, 85, Spanish opera singer.
R. L. Burnside, 78, American blues musician.
Uvedale Corbett, 95, British soldier, politician and businessman.
Barry Cowsill, 50, American pop-singer and writer, victim of Hurricane Katrina.
Nikki Tilroe, 63, American puppeteer.
Jacob A. Marinsky, 87, American chemist, co-discoverer of the element Promethium.
Yang Kuan, 91, Chinese historian.
Zdobysław Stawczyk, 82, Polish Olympic sprinter.

2
Tom Bailey, 56, American footballer.
Bob Denver, 70, American actor (Gilligan's Island, The Many Loves of Dobie Gillis, The Good Guys), complications from throat cancer.
Adrian Karsten, 45, American ESPN announcer, suicide.
Alexandru Paleologu, 86, Romanian diplomat.
Warren Thomas, 47, American comedian.

3
Rudolf Bäcker, 91, German World War II soldier.
R. S. R. Fitter, 92, British natural historian.
Robert W. Funk, 79, American biblical scholar, founder of the Jesus Seminar, lung failure.
Bernard S. Meyer, 89, American lawyer and politician.
Jens Nygård, 71, Norwegian Olympic sports shooter.
William Rehnquist, 80, American lawyer and jurist, Chief Justice of the United States, thyroid cancer.
James Rossi, 69, American Olympic cyclist.
Ekkehard Schall, 75, German actor.

4
Lloyd Avery II, 36, American actor (Boyz n the Hood) and convicted murderer, beaten.
Dame Nancy Buttfield, 92, Australian politician.
Stanley Jennings, 84, American cartoonist, journalist.
Patricia McQueeney, 77, American actress and talent agent.
Roseli Ocampo-Friedmann, 67, Filipino-American microbiologist and botanist, Parkinson's disease.
Alan Truscott, 80, British bridge player, writer, and editor, one of the best known bridge columnists.
Arnold Weinstein, 78, American poet, playwright, and librettist, liver cancer.

5
Hank Anderson, 84, American basketball coach and athletics director.
Rizal Nurdin, 57, Indonesian politician, Governor of North Sumatra, Mandala Airlines Flight 091 crash.
Dhan Singh Thapa, 77, Indian Army officer and recipient of the Param Vir Chakra.
Raja Inal Siregar, 67, Indonesian politician, former Governor of North Sumatra, Indonesia, Mandala Airlines Flight 091 crash.

6
Hasan Abidi, 76, Pakistani journalist and poet.
Eugenia Charles, 86, Dominican politician, Prime Minister (1980–1995), after long illness.
William John Kennedy, 86, Australian Aboriginal rights activist.
Mark Matthews, 111, American supercentenarian and Army first Sergeant, oldest living Buffalo Soldier.
Perugu Siva Reddy, 84, Indian eye surgeon.

7
Omar Ali-Shah, 82/3, Afghan Sufi teacher.
Moussa Arafat, 65, Palestinian former head of general security in Gaza, cousin of Yasser Arafat, murdered.
Sergio Endrigo, 72, Italian singer and songwriter.
Hope Garber, 81, Canadian entertainer and television personality, Alzheimer's disease.
Nicolino Locche, 66, Argentine world boxing champion.
Gilbert Elliot-Murray-Kynynmound, 6th Earl of Minto, 77, Scottish aristocrat.
L. J. K. Setright, 74, British motoring journalist.
Norman Wylie, Lord Wylie, 81, Scottish politician, Lord Advocate (1970–1974).

8
Boris Bittker, 88, American legal academic.
Noel Cantwell, 73, Irish soccer player, former Manchester United captain, cancer.
Oswald Hoffmann, 91, American Lutheran evangelist.
Donald Horne, 83, Australian academic, historian, philosopher and intellectual.
David Pearce, 63, British economist.
Lewis Platt, 64, American businessman and corporate director, former Hewlett Packard CEO.
Perry Stephens, 47, American actor (Loving).

9
Samim Bilgen, 95, Turkish lawyer and musician.
Giuliano Bonfante, 101, Italian linguistics expert and centenarian.
Stanley Dancer, 78, American record-setting harness racing driver.
John Wayne Glover, 72, Australian convicted serial killer nicknamed "The Granny Killer", suicide by hanging
André Pousse, 85, French actor.
Tarzan Taborda, 70, Portuguese wrestling champion, heart attack.
Mel Wanzo, 74, American jazz trombonist.

10
Theodore X. Barber, 78, American psychologist renowned for his critical studies of hypnosis, ruptured aorta.
Sir Hermann Bondi, 85, Austrian-born mathematician & cosmologist; co-advocate (with Gold & Hoyle) of the Steady State theory.
Ken Burgess, 77, Canadian politician.
Clarence "Gatemouth" Brown, 81, American blues musician.
Lea Nikel, 86, Israeli abstract artist.
Charlie Williams, 61, American former Major League Baseball umpire, complications of diabetes.
E. Stewart Williams, 95, American architect, known for "Desert Modernism".

11
Messias José Baptista, 37, Brazilian Olympic athlete.
Odd Berg, 98, Norwegian ship owner.
Al Casey, 89, American jazz guitarist, colon cancer.
Steve de Shazer, 65, American psychotherapist, founder of Brief Family Therapy Center in Milwaukee, Wisconsin and developer of solution focused brief therapy.
Chris Schenkel, 82, American sportscaster, emphysema.
Joseph Smitherman, 75, American politician, longtime mayor of Selma, Alabama, reformed segregationist.
Henryk Tomaszewski, 91, Polish internationally recognized graphic artist.

12
Helmut Baierl, 78, German playwright.
Stephen Capen, 59, American radio presenter.
Serge Lang, 78, American mathematician and political activist.
Ronald Leigh-Hunt, 88, British actor.
Alain Polaniok, 46, French footballer.
Katherine Sanford, 90, American cell biologist and cancer researcher, first to clone a mammal cell in vitro
Susan Anne Catherine Torres, 40 days, American baby born to Susan Torres, brain-dead woman, heart failure after intestinal surgery.

13
Ann Barnes, 60, American actress and singer.
Toni Fritsch, 60, Austrian-born football player and American football placekicker with the Dallas Cowboys, San Diego Chargers, Houston Oilers, and New Orleans Saints.
Jack Green, 83, Australian cricketer.
Helen Longley, 84, American politician, former First Lady of Maine, widow of former Governor James B. Longley.
Julio César Turbay Ayala, 89, Colombian lawyer and politician, President of Colombia (1978–1982).
Haydee Yorac, 64, Filipino lawyer and public servant.

14
Kent Bellows, 56, American painter.
William Berenberg, 89, American physician, leader in the treatment and rehabilitation of disabled children, professor of pediatrics, emeritus , at Harvard Medical School.
Justin "Jud" Hurd, 92, American cartoonist, editor and founder of Cartoonist PROfiles magazine.
Frances Newton, 40, American executed for murder in Texas, first African American woman executed there since 1858.
Kenneth Turpin, 90, English former Provost of Oriel College, Oxford and Vice-Chancellor of University of Oxford.
Vladimir Volkoff, 72, French-born Russian spy novelist.
Robert Wise, 91, American film director (The Sound of Music, West Side Story, The Day the Earth Stood Still), Oscar winner (1962), heart failure.

15
William S. Bartman, 58, American businessman and art patron, multiple organ failure.
Samuel Azu Crabbe, 77, Ghanaian jurist, Chief Justice of Ghana (1973-1977).
Guy Green, 91, British film director and noted cinematographer.
Charles Nicholas Hales, 70, British biochemist and physician.
Jeronimas Kačinskas, 98, Lithuanian-born classical composer and conductor.
Sid Luft, 89, American film producer, Judy Garland's third and last surviving husband.

16
Stanley Burnshaw, 99, American renowned poet and literary figure.
Arkadiusz Gołaś, 24, Polish volleyball player, member of Poland men's national volleyball team in 2001–2005, a participant of the Olympic Games 2004.
Gordon Gould, 85, American pioneer in laser technology.
Jay M. Gould, 90, American epidemiologist and anti-nuclear activist, heart disease.
Donald S. Harrington, 91, American politician and religious leader, unitarian minister and former chairman and spokesman of the Liberal Party of New York.
Harold Q. Masur, 96, American novelist.
John McMullen, 87, American businessman, naval architect and former owner of Major League Baseball's Houston Astros and the NHL's New Jersey Devils.
Constance Moore, 85, American actress (Buck Rogers).
Mzukisi Sikali, 34, South African boxer, murdered during street robbery.

17
Donn Clendenon, 70, American baseball player, MVP of the 1969 World Series, leukemia.
Joel Hirschhorn, 67, American Academy Award-winning songwriter.
Jacques Lacarrière, 79, French author and classical translator.
Jack Lesberg, 85, American jazz bassist.
David E. Mark, 81, American former U.S. ambassador to Burundi, car accident.
Alfred Reed, 84, American neo-classical composer.
Edward Stutman, 60, American senior trial attorney, retired lawyer and U.S. Justice Department official known for prosecution of alleged Nazi war criminals.

18
Marta Bohn-Meyer, 48, American pilot and engineer for NASA.
Richard Britton, 34, Northern Ireland motorcycle racer, racing accident.
Richard E. Cunha, 83, American cinematographer and director
Sandra Feldman, 65, American advocate for disadvantaged students, teacher and labor leader, breast cancer.
Marv Grissom, 87, American baseball player and coach.
Richard Holden, 74, Canadian lawyer and politician.
Noel Mander, 93, British organ maker and restorer.
Michael Park, 39, British rally co-pilot, rally accident.
Rupert Riedl, 80, Austrian zoologist and advocate of evolutionary epistemology.
Clint C. Wilson, Sr., 90, African American editorial cartoonist, Los Angeles Sentinel.
Yegor Yakovlev, 75, Russian journalist, leading opponent of press censorship.
Roz Young, 92, American author, educator, historian, and columnist.

19
John Bromfield, 83, American actor, renal failure.
Marv Grissom, 87, American baseball player and pitching coach.
Willie Hutch, 59, American record producer, singer and songwriter.
Isao Nakauchi, 83, Japanese businessman, founder of Daiei, stroke.
John Rayner, 81, German-born British rabbi.
William Vacchiano, 93, American trumpeter and professor of music.

20
Matest M. Agrest, 90, Russian ethnologist.
Joe Bauman, 83, American longtime minor league baseball record-holder (72 home runs in 1954), pneumonia.
Franzi Groszmann, 100, Austrian-born last surviving Kindertransport mother, consultant on the film Into the Arms of Strangers.
Tobias Schneebaum, 83, American writer, artist, and explorer.
Simon Wiesenthal, 96, Austrian Holocaust survivor and Nazi hunter.

21
Patrick Alexander, 65, Irish-born Australian poet.
Lena Brogren, 76, Swedish actress.
Harry Heltzer, 94, American inventor, former CEO of 3M.
Ramón Martín Huerta, 48, Mexican politician, minister of public security of the Mexican federal government, helicopter crash. 
Humphrey Kelleher, 59, Irish Gaelic footballer.
Félix Javier Pérez, 33, Puerto Rican basketball player and former member of the Puerto Rican National Basketball Team, murdered during robbery.
Preben Philipsen, 95, Danish film producer.
Joseph Smagorinsky, 81, American meteorologist and mathematician, pioneer in the use of mathematical modeling as a weather forecasting tool, complications of Parkinson's disease.
Albert "Caesar" Tocco, 77, American convicted organized crime boss.
Molly Yard, 93, American feminist, former president of the U.S. National Organization for Women.

22
Monty Basgall, 83, American baseball coach.
Rolf Berntzen, 85, Norwegian actor.
Joop Doderer, 84, Dutch actor who played Swiebertje for 17 years. 
Bayaman Erkinbayev, 38, Kyrgyz former wrestler, businessman, and prominent parliamentarian, shot to death.
Leavander Johnson, 35, American former International Boxing Federation lightweight champion boxer, brain injury suffered in bout.
Hans Samelson, 89, German-born American mathematician, natural causes.

23
Roger Brierley, 70, British actor (Young Sherlock Holmes, A Fish Called Wanda, About a Boy).
Apolônio de Carvalho, 93, Brazilian founder of Brazil's ruling Workers' Party, leftist political icon.
John Knatchbull, 7th Baron Brabourne, 80, British television producer.
Betty Leslie-Melville, 78, American wildlife conservationist and giraffe expert, complications of dementia.
Filiberto Ojeda Ríos, 72, Puerto Rican nationalist and leader of the Boricua Popular Army.

24
Tommy Bond, 79, American actor known for playing Butch on Our Gang, heart disease.
Betty Curnow, 93, New Zealand artist.
Leopold B. Felsen, 81, German leading physicist in the study of waves, Holocaust survivor, complications of surgery.
Byron "Mex" Johnson, 94, American Negro league baseball player, prostate cancer.
Rod Oliver, 83, Australian politician.
Daniel Podrzycki, 42, Polish left wing politician, presidential candidate.
Barry Ramachandra Rao, 82, Indian space physicist.
André Testut, 79, Monegasque Formula One driver.
Bala Usman, Nigerian academic, politician and historian.

25
Don Adams, 82, American actor (Get Smart, Inspector Gadget, Check It Out!), lung infection.
George Archer, 65, American golfer and 1969 Masters winner, Burkitt's lymphoma.
Georges Arvanitas, 74, French-born Greek jazz pianist and composer.
Abu Azzam, Iraqi Al-Qaeda's second-in-command in Iraq, shot to death by United States forces.
Aquila al-Hashimi, Iraqi politician, member of the Governing Council.
Urie Bronfenbrenner, 88, Russian-born U.S. professor of psychology, among the founders of the Head Start program in the U.S., complications of diabetes.
Lionel Kochan, 83, British historian.
Steve Marcus, 66, American jazz saxophonist.
M. Scott Peck, 69, American psychiatrist and author.
Friedrich Peter, 84, Austrian politician (chairman of the Freedom Party of Austria 1958-1978), controversial as a former member of the Waffen-SS.

26
Eugen Ciucă, 92, Romanian-American artist.
Helen Cresswell, 71, British author of children's literature, ovarian cancer.
Lowell E. English, 90, United States Marine Corps major general.
Heidi Genée, 66, German film editor, director and screenwriter.
Monty Gopallawa, 63, Sri Lankan politician, son of former Sri Lankan president William Gopallawa and governor of Central Province, Sri Lanka.
Jozef Karel, 83, Slovak football player and coach.
Shawntinice Polk, 22, American center on the University of Arizona's women's basketball team, pulmonary embolism.

27
Herman Ashworth, 32, American convicted murderer, executed in Ohio.
Karl Decker, 84, Austrian football player and manager.
Ronald Golias, 76, Brazilian comedian.
Jerry Juhl, 67, American writer and puppeteer (The Muppets, Sesame Street, Fraggle Rock).
Brett Kebble, 41, South African mining magnate, murdered.
John McCabe, 84, American biographer of Laurel and Hardy.
Ronald Pearsall, 77, English author.
Willem van de Sande Bakhuyzen, 47, Dutch film director, cancer.
Mary Lee Settle, 87, American author (the Beulah Quintet), lung cancer.

28
Ahmad Abdullah, 64, Malaysian accountant and politician.
Pol Bury, 83, Belgian sculptor.
Sir Mark Heath, 78, British diplomat, Ambassador to the Holy See.
Alan Matheney, 54, American convicted murderer, executed in Indiana.
Constance Baker Motley, 84, American civil rights lawyer and the first female African American federal judge, congestive heart failure.
Leo Sternbach, 97, Austrian-native chemist, known as the "Father of Valium".

29
Olga de Alaketu, 80, Benin-born Brazilian Candomblé high priestess, complications of diabetes.
Patrick Caulfield, 69, British artist.
Benjamin DeMott, 81, American writer, scholar, and cultural critic, cardiac arrest.
Robert Dorgebray, 89, French Olympic cyclist.
Austin Leslie, 71, American famed New Orleans chef (also the inspiration for the television show Frank's Place), hospitalized with pneumonia since his evacuation several days after Hurricane Katrina.
Gordon McKeag, 77, English solicitor and football club chairman (Newcastle United F.C.).
Gennadi Sarafanov, 63, Soviet Soyuz 15 cosmonaut.
Mogens Schou, 86, Danish psychiatrist.
Ivar Karl Ugi, 75, German chemist.

30
Basil Glass, 79, Northern Irish politician.
Monika Hellwig, 74, German-born American theologian and Roman Catholic lay leader, cerebral hemorrhage.
Andrew P. O'Meara, 98, United States Army general, stroke.
Sergei Starostin, 52, Russian linguist.

References

2005-09
 09